Meadowdale High School  may refer to:

 Meadowdale High School (Ohio), Harrison Township, near Dayton, Ohio
 Meadowdale High School (Washington), Lynnwood, Washington